Mevlânâ Mehmed Neşri (born c. 1450 – died 1520?), also commonly referred to as Neshri, was an Ottoman historian, a prominent representative of the early Ottoman historiography.

Very little is known about Neşri, which suggests that he was not a major literary figure during his lifetime. Then contemporary sources refer to him with the modest title of muderris (teacher), which further suggested that he did not hold a high office. He witnessed the death of Mehmed II in 1481 and the Janissary riots that followed it. He is known as the author of the universal history Cosmorama or Cihan-Nümâ. Only the sixth and final parts of this work are preserved today. He probably completed it between 1487 and February 1493. 

According to the historian Paul Wittek, Neşri based his work on the early Ottoman historian work of Aşıkpaşazade, a chronological list of the mid-15th century and an anonymous chronicle of the late 15th century, amalgamating the three primary historiographical traditions then popular. His text became a principal source for many later historians, both Ottoman and European.

References

Sources 
 
 Kitab-i Cihan-Nümâ, sometimes referred to as Djihan-Nümâ, partially edited and translated in Journal of the German Oriental Society. 13. Volume 1859
 NEŞRÎ - Osmanlı tarihçisi Published in the 33rd Volume of TDV İslâm Ansiklopedisi in 2007, pp.20—22, Istanbul.

15th-century historians from the Ottoman Empire
16th-century historians from the Ottoman Empire
1450s births
1520 deaths
Year of birth uncertain